A passive repeater or passive radio link deflection, is a reflective or sometimes refractive panel or other object that assists in closing a radio or microwave link, in places where an obstacle in the signal path blocks any direct, line of sight communication.

Compared to a microwave radio relay station with active components, a passive repeater is far simpler and needs little maintenance and no on-site electric power. It also does not require additional frequencies, unlike active repeater stations which use different transmit and receive frequencies to prevent feedback.  The corresponding disadvantage is that without amplification the returned signal is significantly weaker, although in some configurations they can actually provide gain of 100 to 130 dB for u.h.f. and microwave radio-relay stations.

Passive radio relay link deflection systems in the vertical level can be realized by receiving the signal with a parabolic antenna and leading it through a waveguide to a second parabolic antenna, where it is radiated. For passive microwave radio relay link deflections in the horizontal plane, flat surfaces of metallic material are used, arranged so that the angle of incoming beam corresponds to the angle of the outcoming signal.  The resulting structure resembles a billboard.   

Similar systems are used also occasionally for TV relay transmitters or as tunnel transmitters. In these cases, a Yagi antenna receives the transmitted signal and supplies it by way of a coaxial cable to a second Yagi antenna.

Photos of microwave repeaters
See also external links for photos of variety of other passive repeaters.

External links 

 Radio Mirrors for Communications, May 1969 Electronics World
 Passive Repeater Engineering, Microflect, Co. Inc, 1989
 Microwave passive repeater in Maryland

References

Telecommunications infrastructure

it: Ripetitore